The 2022 Norwegian Second Division (referred to as PostNord-ligaen for sponsorship reasons) was a Norwegian football third-tier league season. The league consisted of 28 teams divided into 2 groups of 14 teams.

The league was played as a double round-robin tournament, where all teams played 26 matches. The season started on 9 April 2022 and ended on 22 October 2022, not including play-off matches.

Team changes
Last season, Kongsvinger and Skeid were promoted to the 2022 Norwegian First Division, while Florø, Fløya, Fram Larvik, Nardo, Rosenborg 2 and Senja were relegated to the 2022 Norwegian Third Division.

Strømmen and Ull/Kisa were relegated from the 2021 Norwegian First Division, while Frigg, Gjøvik-Lyn, Staal Jørpeland, Træff, Ullern and Ørn Horten were promoted from the 2021 Norwegian Third Division.

Group 1

Teams

The following 14 clubs compete in group 1:

League table

Results

Top scorers

Group 2

Teams

The following 14 clubs compete in group 2:

League table

Results

Top scorers

Promotion play-offs

The teams who finish in second place in their respective group qualify for the promotion play-offs, where they face each other over two legs. The winner goes on to play against the 14th-placed team in the First Division for a place in the First Division next season.

Arendal won 3–1 on aggregate.

References

Norwegian Second Division seasons
3
Norway
Norway